The Treaty of Tordesillas, signed in Tordesillas, Spain on 7 June 1494, and authenticated in Setúbal, Portugal, divided the newly discovered lands outside Europe between the Portuguese Empire and the Spanish Empire (Crown of Castile), along a meridian 370 leagues west of the Cape Verde islands, off the west coast of Africa. That line of demarcation was about halfway between the Cape Verde islands (already Portuguese) and the islands visited by Christopher Columbus on his first voyage (claimed for Castile and León), named in the treaty as Cipangu and Antillia (Cuba and Hispaniola).

The lands to the east would belong to Portugal and the lands to the west to Castile, modifying an earlier division proposed by Pope Alexander VI. The treaty was signed by Spain, and by Portugal, . Originals of both treaties are kept at the General Archive of the Indies in Spain and at the Torre do Tombo National Archive in Portugal.

Despite considerable lack of information regarding the geography of the New World, Portugal and Spain largely respected the treaty. The other European powers, however, did not sign the treaty and generally ignored it, particularly those that became Protestant after the Reformation. Similarly, the indigenous peoples of the Americas did not acknowledge the treaty, and as the legal foundation for the discovery doctrine, it has been a source of ongoing tension regarding land ownership into modern times.

The treaty was included by UNESCO in 2007 in its Memory of the World Programme.

Signing and enforcement

The Treaty of Tordesillas was intended to solve the dispute that arose following the return of Christopher Columbus and his crew, who had sailed under the Crown of Castile. On his way back to Spain he first stopped at Lisbon, where he requested another meeting with King John II to prove to him that there were more islands to the southwest of the Canary Islands.

After learning of the Castilian-sponsored voyage, the Portuguese King sent a threatening letter to the Catholic Monarchs, King Ferdinand and Queen Isabella, stating that by the Treaty of Alcáçovas signed in 1479 and by the 1481 papal bull Aeterni regis that granted all lands south of the Canary Islands to Portugal, all of the lands discovered by Columbus belonged, in fact, to Portugal. The Portuguese king also stated that he was already making arrangements for a fleet (an armada led by Francisco de Almeida) to depart shortly and take possession of the new lands. The Spanish rulers replied that Spain owned the islands discovered by Columbus and warned King João not permit anyone from Portugal to go there. Finally, the rulers invited Portugal to send ambassadors to begin diplomatic negotiations aimed at settling the rights of each nation in the Atlantic. 

On 4 May 1493 Pope Alexander VI (Rodrigo Borgia), an Aragonese from Valencia by birth, decreed in the bull Inter caetera that all lands west of a pole-to-pole line 100 leagues west of any of the islands of the Azores or the Cape Verde Islands should belong to Castile, although territory under Christian rule as of Christmas 1492 would remain untouched. The bull did not mention Portugal or its lands, so Portugal could not claim newly discovered lands even if they were east of the line. Another bull, Dudum siquidem, entitled Extension of the Apostolic Grant and Donation of the Indies and dated  1493, gave all mainlands and islands, "at one time or even still belonging to India" to Spain, even if east of the line.

The Portuguese King John II was not pleased with that arrangement, feeling that it gave him far too little land—it prevented him from possessing India, his near term goal. By 1493 Portuguese explorers had reached the southern tip of Africa, the Cape of Good Hope. The Portuguese were unlikely to go to war over the islands encountered by Columbus, but the explicit mention of India was a major issue. As the Pope had not made changes, the Portuguese king opened direct negotiations with the Catholic Monarchs to move the line to the west and allow him to claim newly discovered lands east of the line. In the bargain, John accepted Inter caetera as the starting point of discussion with Ferdinand and Isabella but had the boundary line moved 270 leagues west, protecting the Portuguese route down the coast of Africa and giving the Portuguese rights to lands that now constitute the eastern quarter of Brazil. As one scholar assessed the results, "both sides must have known that so vague a boundary could not be accurately fixed, and each thought that the other was deceived, [concluding that it was a] diplomatic triumph  for Portugal, confirming to the Portuguese not only the true route to India, but most of the South Atlantic".

The treaty was negotiated without consulting Pope Alexander VI and effectively countered his bulls.

Very little of the newly divided area had actually been seen by Europeans, as it was only divided via the treaty. Castile gained lands including most of the Americas, which in 1494 had little proven wealth. The easternmost part of current Brazil was granted to Portugal when in 1500 Pedro Álvares Cabral landed there while he was en route to India. Some historians contend that the Portuguese already knew of the South American bulge that makes up most of Brazil before this time, so his landing in Brazil was not an accident. One scholar points to Cabral's landing on the Brazilian coast 12 degrees farther south than the expected Cape São Roque, such that "the likelihood of making such a landfall as a result of freak weather or navigational error was remote; and it is highly probable that Cabral had been instructed to investigate a coast whose existence was not merely suspected, but already known".

The line was not strictly enforced—the Spanish did not resist the Portuguese expansion of Brazil across the meridian. However, Spain attempted to stop the Portuguese advance in Asia, by claiming the meridian line ran around the world, dividing the whole world in half rather than just the Atlantic.  Portugal pushed back, seeking another papal pronouncement that limited the line of demarcation to the Atlantic. This was given by Pope Leo X, who was friendly toward Portugal and its discoveries, in 1514 in the bull Praecelsae devotionis.

The divided possessions sanctioned by the treaty continued, even when Spain and Portugal were united under a single king between 1580 and 1640, until the treaty was superseded by the 1750 Treaty of Madrid. 

Emerging Protestant maritime powers, particularly England and The Netherlands, and other third parties such as Catholic France, did not recognize the division of the world between only two Catholic nations brokered by the pope.

Tordesillas meridian

The Treaty of Tordesillas only specified the line of demarcation in leagues from the Cape Verde Islands. It did not specify the length of the league, its equivalent in equatorial degrees, or even which of the Cape Verde islands was intended. Instead, the treaty provided that these matters were to be settled by a joint voyage. This voyage never occurred, and instead there were only a series of nonbinding expert opinions produced over the next several decades. Their computations were further complicated by remaining uncertainty about the exact equatorial circumference of the earth. As such, each proposed line can be variously computed using geographical leagues defined in terms of a degree using a ratio which applies regardless of the size of the earth or using a specifically measured league applied to the actual equatorial circumference of the earth, with allowances necessary for the imperfect Portuguese and Spanish knowledge of its true dimensions.
 The earliest Aragonese opinion was provided by Jaime Ferrer in 1495 at the request of Ferdinand and Isabella. He stated to them that the demarcation line was 18° west of the most central island of the Cape Verde Islands, equivalent to 24°25′ west of Greenwich. (Harrisse concludes Ferrer must have meant Fogo as this central island.) Thus, Ferrer placed the line at 42°25′ W. on his sphere, which was 21.1% larger than the actual size of the earth.
 The earliest surviving Portuguese opinion is on the Cantino planisphere of 1501 or 1502, generally considered to represent the Portuguese standard map of its day. Because its demarcation line was midway between Cape Saint Roque, the northeast cape of South America, and the mouth of the Amazon River, labeled the Great River with an estuary marked "All of this sea is fresh water", Harrisse computed that this line was at 42°30′ W. on the actual globe. Harrisse believed the large estuary just west of the line on the Cantino map was that of the Rio Maranhão (this estuary is now the Baía de São Marcos and the river is now the Mearim), whose flow is so weak that its gulf does not contain fresh water.
 In 1518, another Castilian opinion was provided by Martin Fernandez de Enciso. Harrisse computes that Enciso's sphere was 7.7% smaller than the actual size of the earth so his line at 47°24′ W. corresponds to the actual 45°38′ W. based on his other numerical data. Enciso further described the coastal features near which the line passed, but in a very confused manner that might place the line as far west as the mouth of the Amazon between 49°W and 50°W.
 In 1524, the Castilian pilots Thomas Duran, Sebastian Cabot (son of John Cabot), and Juan Vespuccius (nephew of Amerigo Vespucci) gave their opinion to the conference at Badajoz, whose failure to resolve the dispute led to the Treaty of Saragossa. Based on their understanding of the equator, Harrisse concludes they intended 47°17′ W. on their sphere (3.1% smaller than ours) or 46°36′W on the actual globe.
 At the same conference, the Portuguese presented a globe on which the line was marked as 21°30′ west of Santo Antão, which would place it at 47°16′52″ W. when adjusted to match the actual circumference of the earth, nearly identical to the Spanish suggestion. However, the Badajoz conference disbanded without reaching any formal settlement on any issue.
 The 1529 Treaty of Zaragoza, agreed to by the Spanish king Charles I (Emperor Charles V) and the Portuguese king John III, implicitly assumes within its measurements of a new eastern line that the leagues of the two treaties should be understood as a geographical league equivalent to 4/70th of an equatorial degree, placing the line between 43°56′ and 46°18′ W. depending on the island chosen. Note, however, that the 1529 Diogo Ribeiro mapgenerally considered to represent the now lost Spanish standard map used to finalize the agreement at Zaragozaplaced its own delineation of the Tordesillas agreement much further west, around 49°45′ W.

Antimeridian: Moluccas and Treaty of Zaragoza

Initially, the line of demarcation did not encircle the earth. Instead, Spain and Portugal could conquer any new lands they were the first to discover, Spain to the west and Portugal to the east, even if they passed each other on the other side of the globe. But Portugal's discovery of the highly valued Moluccas in 1512 caused Spain to argue in 1518 that the Treaty of Tordesillas divided the earth into two equal hemispheres. After the surviving ships of Magellan's fleet visited the Moluccas in 1521, Spain claimed that those islands were within its western hemisphere. In the early 16th century, the Treaty between Spain and Portugal, concluded at Vitoria; 19 February 1524 and called for the Badajoz Junta to meet in 1524, at which the two countries tried to reach an agreement on the anti-meridian but failed. They finally agreed in the Treaty of Zaragoza that Spain would relinquish its claims to the Moluccas upon the payment of 350,000 ducats of gold by Portugal to Spain. To prevent Spain from encroaching upon Portugal's Moluccas, the anti-meridian was to be  leagues or 17° to the east of the Moluccas, passing through the islands of Las Velas and Santo Thome. This distance is slightly smaller than the 300 leagues determined by Magellan as the westward distance from los Ladrones to the Philippine island of Samar, which is just west of due north of the Moluccas.

The Moluccas are a group of islands west of New Guinea. However, unlike the large modern Indonesian archipelago of the Maluku Islands, to 16th-century Europeans the Moluccas were a small chain of islands, the only place on earth where cloves grew, just west of the large north Malukan island of Halmahera (called Gilolo at the time). Cloves were so prized by Europeans for their medicinal uses that they were worth their weight in gold. 16th- and 17th-century maps and descriptions indicate that the main islands were Ternate, Tidore, Moti, Makian and Bacan, although the last was often ignored even though it was by far the largest island. The principal island was Ternate at the chain's northern end (0°47′N, only  in diameter) on whose southwest coast the Portuguese built a stone fort (Forte de São João Baptista de Ternate) during 1522–23, which could only be repaired, not modified, according to the Treaty of Saragossa. This north–south chain occupies two degrees of latitude bisected by the equator at about 127°24′E, with Ternate, Tidore, Moti, and Makian north of the equator and Bacan south of it.

Although the treaty's Santo Thome island has not been identified, its "Islas de las Velas" (Islands of the Sails) appear in a 1585 Spanish history of China, on the 1594 world map of Petrus Plancius, on an anonymous map of the Moluccas in the 1598 London edition of Linschoten, and on the 1607 world map of Petro Kærio, identified as a north–south chain of islands in the northwest Pacific, which were also called the "Islas de los Ladrones" (Islands of the Thieves) during that period. Their name was changed by Spain in 1667 to "Islas de las Marianas" (Mariana Islands), which include Guam at their southern end. Guam's longitude of 144°45′E is east of the Moluccas' longitude of 127°24′E by 17°21′, which is remarkably close by 16th-century standards to the treaty's 17° east. This longitude passes through the eastern end of the main north Japanese island of Hokkaidō and through the eastern end of New Guinea, which is where Frédéric Durand placed the demarcation line. Moriarty and Keistman placed the demarcation line at 147°E by measuring 16.4° east from the western end of New Guinea (or 17° east of 130°E). Despite the treaty's clear statement that the demarcation line passes 17° east of the Moluccas, some sources place the line just east of the Moluccas.

The Treaty of Saragossa did not modify or clarify the line of demarcation provided by the Treaty of Tordesillas, nor did it validate Spain's claim to equal hemispheres (180° each), so the two lines divided the earth into unequal hemispheres. Portugal's portion was roughly 191° whereas Spain's portion was roughly 169°. Both portions have a large uncertainty of ±4° because of the wide variation in the opinions regarding the location of the Tordesillas line.

Portugal gained control of all lands and seas west of the Saragossa line, including all of Asia and its neighboring islands so far discovered, leaving Spain most of the Pacific Ocean. Although the Philippines were not named in the treaty, Spain implicitly relinquished any claim to them because they were well west of the line. Nevertheless, by 1542, King Charles I of Spain (who was also Emperors Charles V of the Holy Roman Empire) decided to colonize the Philippines, judging that Portugal would not protest because the archipelago had no spices. Although a number of expeditions sent from New Spain arrived in the Philippines, they were unable to establish a settlement because the return route across the Pacific was unknown. King Philip II succeeded in 1565 when he sent Miguel López de Legazpi and Andrés de Urdaneta, establishing the initial Spanish trading post at Cebu and later founding Manila in 1571.

Besides Brazil and the Moluccas, Portugal eventually controlled Angola, Mozambique, Portuguese Guinea, and São Tomé and Príncipe (among other territories and bases) in Africa; several bases or territories as Muscat, Ormus and Bahrain in the Persian Gulf, Goa, Bombay and Daman and Diu (among other coastal cities) in India; Ceylon, and Malacca, bases in present-day Indonesia as Makassar, Solor, Ambon, and Portuguese Timor, the entrepôt-base of Macau and the entrepôt-enclave of Dejima (Nagasaki) in the Far East.

Spain, on the other hand, would control vast western regions in the Americas, in areas ranging from the present-day United States to present-day Argentina, an empire that would extend to the Philippines, and bases in Ternate and Formosa (17th century).

Effect on other European powers
The treaty was important in dividing Latin America, as well as establishing Spain in the western Pacific.  However, it quickly became obsolete in North America, and later in Asia and Africa, where it affected colonization.  It was ignored by other European nations, and with the decline of Spanish and Portuguese power, the home countries were unable to hold many of their claims, much less expand them into poorly explored areas.  Thus, with sufficient backing, it became possible for any European state to colonize open territories, or those weakly held by Lisbon or Madrid.  With the fall of Malacca to the Dutch, the VOC (Dutch East India Company) took control of Portuguese possessions in Indonesia, claiming Western New Guinea and Western Australia, as New Holland. Eastern Australia remained in the Spanish half of the world until claimed for Britain by James Cook in 1770. That said, "the current border between Western Australia on the one hand, and South Australia and the Northern Territory on the other hand (originally the western border of New South Wales, 1788) is still based on the Tordesillas line [...] rather than on Australian Aboriginal tribal boundaries".

The attitude towards the treaty that other governments had was expressed by France's Francis I, who declared, "The sun shines for me as it does for others. I would very much like to see the clause of Adam’s will by which I should be denied my share of the world."

Treaty of Madrid

On January 13, 1750, King John V of Portugal and Ferdinand VI of Spain signed the Treaty of Madrid, in which both parties sought to establish the borders between Brazil and Spanish America, admitting that the Treaty of Tordesillas, as it had been envisioned in 1494 had been superseded, and was considered void. Spanish sovereignty was acknowledged over the Philippines, while Portugal would get the territory of the Amazon River basin. Portugal would relinquish the colony of Sacramento, on the northern bank of the River Plata in modern-day Uruguay, while getting the territory of the Seven Missions.

Following the Guarani War, the treaty was annulled by Spain and Portugal in the Treaty of El Pardo (1761). The border was  eventually settled in the First Treaty of San Ildefonso in 1777, with Spain acquiring territories east of the Uruguay River and Portugal acquiring territories in the Amazon Basin.

Modern claims
The Treaty of Tordesillas was  invoked by Chile in the 20th century to defend the principle of an Antarctic sector extending along a meridian to the South Pole, as well as the assertion that the treaty made Spanish (or Portuguese) all undiscovered land south to the Pole.

The Treaty of Tordesillas was also invoked by Argentina in the 20th century as part of its claim to the Falkland Islands.

See also
 Catholic Church and the Age of Discovery
 History of Portugal (1415–1578)
 List of treaties

Notes

References

Citations

Bibliography

 .
 .
  [Wikisource], with English translation of the treaty.
 , included in the Senate Miscellaneous Documents, Vol. V (1891–1892), pp. 103–30.
 .
 .
 .
 .
 .
  [Wikisource] & [Yale Law], with the original Spanish text, notes, and full English translation of the treaty.
 .
 .
 .
 .
 .

External links

 Treaty of Tordesillas (about.com)
 Treaty of Tordesillas (Portuguese) from Archivo General de Indias

1494 in Portugal
1494 in Spain
1529 in law
1490s treaties
History of North America
History of South America
History of the Americas
Latin American history
Ferdinand II of Aragon
Geopolitical rivalry
Isabella I of Castile
Meridians (geography)
Memory of the World Register in Spain
Portugal–Spain relations
Portuguese Empire
Portuguese colonization of the Americas
Spanish colonization of the Americas
Spheres of influence
History of the Philippines (1565–1898)
Tordesillas
Treaties of the Spanish Empire
1494 in the Spanish Empire
1494 in the Portuguese Empire
History of the province of Valladolid